Modestas is a Lithuanian masculine given name. Individuals with the name Modestas include:
Modestas Paulauskas (born 1945), Lithuanian basketball player and coach 
Modestas Stonys (born 1980), Lithuanian footballer
Modestas Vaičiulis (born 1989), Lithuanian cross-country skier

References

Lithuanian masculine given names